Leszno  is a village in the administrative district of Gmina Przasnysz, within Przasnysz County, Masovian Voivodeship, in east-central Poland.

The village has a population of 800.

References

Leszno